Flavia Hall is a building on the now defunct Marylhurst University campus, in Marylhurst, Oregon, United States. It was designed by architects Joseph Jacobberger and Alfred H. Smith, and completed . The building originally served as a dormitory, and was later converted into an office building. The university closed in late 2018.

The university's Harry A. Merlo Science Center was unveiled in 1997 as part of the building's $3.2 million renovation.

References

External links

 

1937 establishments in Oregon
Marylhurst University
University and college buildings completed in 1937